Jean-Claude Corre (born 14 September 1961) is a French retired race walker. He represented his country at the 1988 Summer Olympics as well as one indoor and three outdoor World Championships. Corre was born in Montreal, Quebec, Canada.

Competition record

Personal bests
Outdoor
10,000 metres walk – 39:44.87 (Dreux 1992)
20 kilometres walk – 1:23:09 (Seoul 1988)
50 kilometres walk – 3:51:51 (Stuttgart 1993)

Indoor
5000 metres walk – 18:50.48 (Paris 1994)

References

1961 births
Living people
French male racewalkers
Athletes from Montreal
Olympic athletes of France
Athletes (track and field) at the 1988 Summer Olympics
World Athletics Championships athletes for France
Athletes (track and field) at the 1987 Mediterranean Games
Mediterranean Games competitors for France